Newlin is an unincorporated community in Hall County in the U.S. state of Texas.

References

Unincorporated communities in Hall County, Texas
Unincorporated communities in Texas